The 2002 Pro Bowl was the NFL's all-star game for the 2001 season. The game was played on February 9, 2002, at Aloha Stadium in Honolulu, Hawaii. The final score was AFC 38, NFC 30. Rich Gannon of the Oakland Raiders was the game's MVP.

AFC roster

Offense

Defense

Special teams

NFC roster

Offense

Defense

Special teams

Notes:
Replacement selection due to injury or vacancy
Injured player; selected but did not play
Replacement starter; selected as reserve
"Need player"; named by coach
Other additional player; added by league

Number of selections per team

References

External links
Official Pro Bowl website at NFL.com

Pro Bowl
Pro Bowl
Pro Bowl
Pro Bowl
Pro Bowl
American football competitions in Honolulu
February 2002 sports events in the United States